The fifth season of the Australian police-drama Blue Heelers premiered on the Seven Network on 24 February 1998 and aired on Wednesday nights at 8:30 PM. The 41-episode season concluded 25 November 1998.

The 41-episode fifth season saw the show move to Wednesday nights at 8:30 PM, making way for All Saints on Tuesdays at 8.30 PM. Ratings dipped, but finished still finished the number 2 show for the year with 2,240,000 in the five cities.

Casting
Main cast for this season consisted of:
 John Wood as Sergeant → Senior Sergeant Tom Croydon [full season]
 Julie Nihill as Christine 'Chris' Riley [full season]
 Martin Sacks as Senior Detective → Acting Sergeant (self demoted) Patrick Joseph 'P.J.' Hasham [full season]
 Lisa McCune as Constable → Senior Constable → Acting Sergeant Margaret 'Maggie' Doyle [full season]
 William McInnes as Senior Constable → Acting Sergeant → Sergeant Nicholas 'Nick' Schultz [until episode 207]
 Damian Walshe-Howling as Constable Adam Cooper [full season]
 Tasma Walton as Constable Deirdre 'Dash' McKinley [full season]
 Paul Bishop as Detective Acting Sergeant (demoted) → Senior Constable Benjamin 'Ben' Stewart [from episode 198]

Damian Walshe-Howling appeared in the full season as Adam Cooper but finished his almost five-year career on the show with the show's season five finale - "Rotten Apple (Part 2)".

Paul Bishop began his playing his part of Ben Stewart before he actually became a permanent cast member in the episode "Nine Lives". William McInnes left the series because of lack of his storyline in the show and moving on to further projects

Recurring characters for this season include:
 Peta Doodson as Inspector Monica Draper
 Beth Buchanan as Susan Croydon
 Michael Isaacs as Clancy Freeman
 Suzi Dougherty as Dr. Mel Carter
 Axl Taylor as Len the barman
 Dennis Miller as Ex-Sergeant Pat Doyle
 Stuart Baker as "Richo"
 Reg Evans as Keith Purvis
 Terry Gill as Chief Superintendent Clive Adamson
 Karen Davitt as Dr. Zoe Hamilton
 Don Bridges as Charlie Clarke
 Marie Trevor as Lelia Clegg
 Pauline Terry-Bietz as Beth McKinley
 Neil Pigot as Inspector Russell Falcon-Price
 Adam May as Ellis Corby
 Peter Aanensen as Merv Poole
 Jeremy Kewley as Tony Timms
 Kevin Harrington as Charlie McKinley
 Catherine Wilkin as Sally Downie
 Grant Piro as Tim Ryan

Guest actors included Shane Connor, James Condon, John Clayton, Maggie Dence, Peter O'Brien, Shaun Micallef, Ross Williams, Grant Piro, Val Lehman, Monica Maughan, Anne Phelan, Dennis Coard, Carol Burns and Sean Scully.

Awards

Episodes

DVD release

References

General
 Zuk, T. Blue Heelers: 1998 episode guide, Australian Television Information Archive. Retrieved 1 August 2007.
 TV.com editors. Blue Heelers Episode Guide - Season 5, TV.com. Retrieved 1 August 2007.
Specific

Blue Heelers seasons
1998 Australian television seasons